Mossi Issa Moussa (born 24 January 1993) is a Nigerien international footballer.

International career

International goals
Scores and results list Niger's goal tally first.

References

External links 
 

1993 births
Living people
Nigerien footballers
Niger international footballers
Association football forwards
Niger A' international footballers
2016 African Nations Championship players
2020 African Nations Championship players
2022 African Nations Championship players